The Koningslied is a song written for the investiture of prince Willem-Alexander as King of the Netherlands on 30 April 2013. Upon release on request of the Nationaal Comité Inhuldiging (National Committee [for the] Inauguration), the song was met with tough criticism and as a result of the criticism Ewbank withdrew the Koningslied on 20 April 2013. Nevertheless, the Nationaal Comité Inhuldiging confirmed on 22 April 2013 the song would be used as part of the investiture.

Background, release and controversy
John Ewbank composed the music and wrote the lyrics using suggestions that were sent in during a participation project through Dutch social media and the official website of the inauguration. Artists that cooperated on writing the song are Ali B, Bollebof, Daphne Deckers, Fouradi, Lange Frans, Guus Meeuwis, Kraantje Pappie, Gers Pardoel, and Jack Poels.

The Koningslied was released on 19 April 2013. Soon after its release it reached the first position on the iTunes download chart. The song quickly gained heavy criticism. The music, the rap part and the lyrics were fiercely criticized and ridiculed. The same day, an online petition to get rid of the song was started by journalist Sylvia Witteman and was signed 20,000 times. It passed the 40,000 mark a few days later. Alternative King's Songs were released on YouTube soon after. As a result of the criticism Ewbank withdrew the Koningslied on 20 April 2013. The Nationaal Comité Inhuldiging confirmed on 22 April 2013 the song would be used as part of the investiture.

The song cost €550,000, which was paid by the broadcaster Nederlandse Publieke Omroep.

Performance for King Willem-Alexander
The Nationaal Comité Inhuldiging originally intended that the song would be sung on 30 April 2013 for Willem-Alexander in one central place in all the provinces of the Netherlands and in each of the countries of the Netherlands Antilles. This did not happen because of a lack in interest in Maastricht and Assen. In Utrecht, no license was given for the event and in Zwolle the DJ forgot to play the song. The performance of the song in Rotterdam Ahoy by 33 of the participating artists was broadcast on two videoscreens in Amsterdam for Willem-Alexander and Máxima.

Cooperating artists

Rob de Nijs withdrew after reading the song's lyrics.

References

External links
 

2013 songs
Dutch-language songs
Dutch pop songs
Coronation
Cultural depictions of Dutch kings
Songs written by John Ewbank (composer)
Songs about kings
Songs about the Netherlands